Battle of Verona on 26 March 1799 saw a Habsburg Austrian army under Pál Kray fight a First French Republic army led by Barthélemy Louis Joseph Schérer. The battle encompassed three separate combats on the same day. At Verona, the two sides battled to a bloody draw. At Pastrengo to the west of Verona, French forces prevailed over their Austrian opponents. At Legnago to the southeast of Verona, the Austrians defeated their French adversaries. The battle was fought during the War of the Second Coalition, part of the French Revolutionary Wars. Verona is a city on the Adige River in northern Italy.

Result 
At Pastrengo, the French lost 1,000 killed, wounded, and missing out of 22,400 soldiers while inflicting 2,000 killed and wounded on the 11,000 Austrians. In addition, the French captured 1,500 men, 12 guns, two pontoon bridges, and two colors. The Schröder Infantry Regiment Nr. 27 lost particularly serious casualties. At Verona, French losses numbered 1,500 killed and wounded plus 300 men and three guns captured out of a total of 14,500 men. The Austrians counted 1,600 killed and wounded and 1,100 captured out of 16,400 troops. Generals Konrad Valentin von Kaim, Ferdinand Minkwitz, and Anton Lipthay de Kisfalud were wounded. The contest at Legnago cost the French 2,000 killed and wounded and 600 men and 14 guns captured out of 9,500 men. General of Brigade François Felix Vignes was killed. The Austrians lost 700 killed and wounded and 100 captured out of 14,000 soldiers. Lipthay never recovered from his wounds and died on 17 February 1800 at Padua.

References

Sources 
 
 
 
 
 
 Clausewitz, Carl von (2020). Napoleon Absent, Coalition Ascendant: The 1799 Campaign in Italy and Switzerland, Volume 1. Trans and ed. Nicholas Murray and Christopher Pringle. Lawrence, Kansas: University Press of Kansas. 
 
 

Battles of the French Revolutionary Wars
Battles of the War of the Second Coalition
Battles involving Austria
Battles involving France
Conflicts in 1799
1799 in Europe
Battles inscribed on the Arc de Triomphe